Kranji MRT station is an elevated Mass Rapid Transit (MRT) station on the North South line (NSL). Situated in Sungei Kadut, Singapore along Woodlands Road, it serves the Singapore Turf Club and the Woodlands Wafer Fabrication Park. The station is operated by SMRT Trains.

Originally not part of the Woodlands MRT extension plans, Kranji station was later included in November 1992. Completed along with the other Woodlands extension stations on 10 February 1996, it is the largest among the stations, designed to handle a large volume of visitors to the Singapore Turf Club. Designed with a kampung-style roof, the station is integrated with other transportation modes and serves cross-border bus services to Johor Bahru.

History

After the Branch line (from the Jurong East to Choa Chu Kang stations) opened in 1990, the Woodlands MRT line was envisioned so as to connect between Yishun and Choa Chu Kang stations. Initially not part of the first four stations announced for the extension, the station was later included on 19 November 1992 to serve future housing estates in the area and the Singapore Turf Club, which was to be relocated near the station to free up land at its original site in Bukit Timah.

Prior to the construction, eight plots of land owned by the Jurong Town Corporation were acquired by the government in September 1991 to construct the segment between Yew Tee and Kranji. In July 1992, part of a hill along Woodlands Avenue 3 had to be removed using explosives to make way for a viaduct connecting between Marsiling and Kranji. The removal of the hill slope took six months and cost .

In May 1993, then Communications Minister Mah Bow Tan made his first visit to the station site, along with the Marsiling and Sembawang stations. Mah revisited the site on 28 April 1995 along with the Mass Rapid Transit Corporation (MRTC) chairman Wesley D'aranjo and Minister of State for Communications Goh Chee Wee. The station opened on 10 February 1996 along with the other stations on the Woodlands Extension.

Kranji station was the last station to have half-height platform screen doors installed on 14 March 2012 as part of the Land Transport Authority's (LTA) programme to improve safety in MRT stations. Between 2012 and 2013, high-volume low-speed fans were installed at this station as part of a network-wide programme to improve ventilation at the platforms of elevated stations. As part of efforts to improve the overall accessibility of public transport, the overhead pedestrian bridge near Kranji and other stations have lifts installed to improve barrier-free accessibility to major transport nodes. The lifts were installed progressively in 2013.

Station details

Kranji station serves the North South line and is situated between the Yew Tee and Marsiling stations. The official station code is NS7. Being part of the NSL, the station is operated by SMRT Trains. Situated along Woodlands Road, the station has four entrances. Kranji station is linked to the nearby Singapore Turf Club via a sheltered walkway and is close to Takeda Singapore Manufacturing Plant, the Kranji Water Reclamation Plant and the Woodlands Wafer Fabrication Park.

Like all stations on the Woodlands Extension, it has a kampung-style roof. The station is integrated with other transportation modes, with longer sheltered bus bays of  that can accommodate up to three buses, alongside taxi stands and parking for 20 bicycles. The station serves cross-border bus services to Johor Bahru.

Designed to accommodate crowds visiting Singapore Turf Club during race events, Kranji station is the largest station on the Woodlands extension. The  concourse level is three times larger than those at other stations with many fare gates to allow efficient crowd flow. The station has twice the number of escalators and stairs (four escalators and two stairs) and the direction of the escalators could be varied depending on the crowd flow. Initially without shops due to the lack of residential developments, there are now retail shops at the first level of the station as part of the SMRT Shop & Dine Concept.

Notes and references

Notes

References

External links
 

Railway stations in Singapore opened in 1996
Kranji
Mass Rapid Transit (Singapore) stations